The magpie-robins or shamas (from shama, Bengali and Hindi for C. malabaricus) are medium-sized insectivorous birds (some also eat berries and other fruit) in the genus Copsychus. They were formerly in the thrush family Turdidae, but are now treated as part of the Old World flycatcher family Muscicapidae. They are garden- and forest-dwelling species found in Africa and Asia.

The genus Copsychus was introduced by the German naturalist Johann Georg Wagler in 1827. The type species was subsequently designated as the Oriental magpie-robin  (Copsychus saularis) by the English zoologist George Robert Gray in 1840. The name Copsychus is from the Ancient Greek kopsukhos or kopsikhos, meaning "blackbird".

The genus contains 13 species:

The Seychelles magpie-robin is one of the most endangered birds in the world, with a population of less than 250, although this is a notable increase from just 16 in 1970.

References